is a fictional character in the Capcom's Street Fighter series. The fourth female fighter of the series, she made her first appearance in Street Fighter Alpha 2 in 1996. She is a young Japanese girl fighter who idolizes Ryu, by whom she wants to be trained. She has often appeared in other games, including many crossover titles. Sakura has quickly become a firm fan favorite in both Japan and the West.

Appearances

Video games

Street Fighter
Sakura first appears in Street Fighter Alpha 2, where she participates in street fighting after watching Ryu win the first World Warrior tournament. She searches for him and wishes for him to train her to be a better fighter. She eventually comes across Ryu, who tells her he cannot train her as he still has much to learn himself shortly after a sparring match.

In Street Fighter Alpha 3, Sakura decides to travel the world to find Ryu. After Ryu saves her from M. Bison, he promises Sakura a rematch (at around the same time, she met and formed a rivalry with Karin Kanzuki).

Sakura is playable in the Street Fighter EX series' fighting games Street Fighter EX Plus α and Street Fighter EX3. She would also appear as the only non-Street Fighter II character in the proposed but never realized game Street Fighter IV: Flashback. She is featured in the spin-off games Street Fighter: Puzzle Spirits and Street Fighter Battle Combination.

In Street Fighter IV, years have passed since Sakura last saw Ryu, so she decides to find Ryu again for a match in the new worldwide tournament. In the introduction sequences of Super Street Fighter IV, she is often seen in a group of three with Dan Hibiki and Blanka. She eventually finds Ryu. After the tournament, they exchange goodbyes and she realizes that it was love that she felt for him. In her ending, a slightly older-looking Sakura sees Ryu approaching.

In Street Fighter V, she is done with school and now works part-time at an arcade, but wonders what decisions she needs to make in order to be satisfied with her future. Her rivalry with Karin continues and when Karin notices Sakura's problem, she sends Ryu over to Sakura's house to spar with her friend. After the fight, Sakura talks with Ryu and realizes she might be interested in raising a child in the future.

Other games
Sakura makes a guest appearance in the fighting game Rival Schools: United by Fate, where she is involved in the adventure between her Tamagawa Minami High School and various other schools in Aoharu City. After helping her childhood friend Hinata and the others out from within the ordeal, she realizes how much it means to her to protect something she cares about.

Sakura has appeared in various crossover fighting games, including the Marvel vs. Capcom and Capcom vs. SNK series, as well as in Super Gem Fighter Mini Mix and Capcom Fighting Evolution. She has an alter-ego called "Dark Sakura" as a secret character in Marvel Super Heroes vs. Street Fighter. She also appears as DLC in Street Fighter X Tekken with Blanka as her official tag team partner.

Sakura is a playable unit in the tactical role-playing game Namco × Capcom. She is featured in the social game Onimusha Soul, where she appears in three different forms redesigned to fit its feudal Japan theme.  In the mobile puzzle game Street Fighter: Puzzle Spirits, she appears as a super-deformed character. Her likeness appears in We Love Golf! as an unlockable cosplay outfit for the character Meg and her character costume can be unlocked in Crimson Tears.

Other appearances
Sakura is the titular character of the manga series Street Fighter: Sakura Ganbaru! by Masahiko Nakahira, where she becomes a fighter in order to fight Ryu. She starred in the comic book miniseries Street Fighter Legends: Sakura (and the one-shot Street Fighter: Sakura vs. Karin) by UDON, and appeared in UDON's other Street Fighter comic books and the Rival Schools comic. She also appears in the Super Street Fighter graphic novels (sequel to the previous UDON comics), in which she became Ryu's full-time apprentice and succumbed the power of the Dark Hadou before Ryu absorbed it out of her.

Sakura is a character in the anime films Street Fighter Alpha: The Animation and Street Fighter Alpha: Generations, and appears in the episode "Second to None" of the American cartoon series Street Fighter. She is a supporting character in Street Fighter IV: The Ties That Bind, assisting Ken in his efforts to locate Ryu.

Victor Entertainment released a drama CD Street Fighter Zero 2 Another Story in 1996, which had Sakura as the lead character. A sequel followed later that same year. Sakura's theme song, "Kono Omoi o Tsutaetai" sung by Yuko Sasamoto, was released commercially.

Many figures of Sakura were released by various manufacturers, such as one in two versions by Kotobukiya in 2015. "Sakura's bowl of stamina" meals were included in a restaurant menu during one promotional event. Sakura's card is included in the card games Street Fighter Deck-Building Game and Universal Fighting System.

A Sakura cosmetic outfit has also been added to Fortnite.

Design and gameplay
Sakura was created by Akira 'Akiman' Yasuda, who said he expected Hideaki Itsuno and the Street Fighter Alpha team to dislike her as he felt "she was a character outside the game's narrow world view." he thought she was "interesting because she was so different - the sort of character that Alpha and the older Street Fighter games didn't have." Sakura nevertheless quickly became a favorite of the character artist Naoto 'Bengus' Kuroshima as he "could feel able to draw her freely, and to express myself, compared with the expectations that come with drawing Ryu or Chun-Li." Akiman said his choice of Sakura's character type was due to a popular archetype from the works such as Sailor Moon: "As characters, female high school students are all-powerful in Japan."

An early design for Street Fighter Alpha 2 featured her in a kimono shirt and hakama pants, but was later abandoned in favor of sailor fuku with red underwear, often seen during her kicks. One pose used by Sakura after winning a battle is to moonwalk. In the ending of Street Fighter IV, her hair is longer and she now sports a tracksuit top and a pair of athletic shorts. For her appearance in Street Fighter V, Sakura's development ideas resembling her previous games, however in the end she was given a complete redesign to signify her no longer being a high school student despite how "schoolgirl outfit may be the strongest image associated with Sakura" (it is still available as an alternate costume). Other ideas included Sakura working a part-time job at a Japanese bento shop or as an assistant and actor for a motion capture studio. Her new default outfit is based on those worn by Japanese idols and she is wearing a red headband out of respect for Ryu.

Sakura is controlled in the same way as Ryu and Ken, but her special moves flow differently and are less powerful. Sakura's moveset contains many variants of their moves, including a running Shoryuken, a jumping Tatsumaki, and a less-powerful Hadouken that she can charge, though at the cost of distance. Her moves and combos have high potential to stun opponents and also provide many an opportunity for mix-ups. However, her somewhat low stamina and her lack of other available approaches (particularly her weak projectile) require a certain amount of finesse, leaving little room for error; this ultimately makes Sakura a high-risk, high-reward character. Sakura's combo-heavy playstyle, when supplemented by her normal and special attacks, makes her a devastating fighter once she gets an opening. Dark Sakura performs the Hadouken horizontally instead of diagonally and uses the techniques of Akuma.

Reception

The character was mostly well received. Sakura has quickly achieved and retained an extreme popularity in Japanese gaming community and globally among the fans of Street Fighter. She ranked third in the poll for the best characters of 1996 in the Japanese arcade game magazine Gamest and was voted the third most popular Street Fighter character in Capcom's own 2002 poll for the 15th anniversary of the original Street Fighter, after only Chun-Li and Cammy. She came second in Capcom's official poll "Which character would you most like to see in Street Fighter IV?" with 15% of votes, this time beating Chun-Li. She then came first in a Street Fighter character popularity poll held in 2017. In a 2018 worldwide poll by Capcom, Sakura was again voted the most popular Street Fighter character of them all second time in a row. Dark Sakura, counted separately, further placed 49th (out of 109).

Joystiq ranked Sakura fifth on their 2007 list of the top ten girls of PlayStation Portable for the "super hotness" of her school uniform and "cuteness to spare and lots of determination no matter what the odds." In 2008, IGN ranked her as 22nd-top Street Fighter character, noting that while the Japanese schoolgirl design was "obvious", her attitude and funny moments offered a pleasant contrast. She placed 13th on the list of top Street Fighter characters of all time by GameDaily in 2009. GameDaily's further featured her in their "Babe of the Week" series, commenting that "the fact that she dresses like a Japanese schoolgirl gives her lots of bonus points." In 2010, UGO featured her in their lists of the top Street Fighter characters and the "best school girls ever". Complex ranked her as the 15th "most dominant" fighting game character in 2012, as well as placing her sixth on their 2013 list of video game characters that deserve a spin-off. In 2013, GamesRadar staff included her among the 30 best characters in the three decades of Capcom's history, commenting: "Sakura was only the fourth female character in the series, and her spunky, can-do attitude has made her the most popular character of the Alpha series. She was so popular, in fact, that Sakura appeared in multiple Street Fighter spin-offs and even found her way into the main series with Super Street Fight IV." In 2015, Famitsu retrospectively ranked her as the fifth-best female character in the Japanese games of the 1990s.

However, the character has received some negative criticism in the West. By 2000, New Zealand Station noted how "evolution of game babes can plough into dangerous new territory, such as Capcom's pivotal female icon changing from the wholesome and strong-willed Chun Li into the cute but undeniably underaged Sakura (though curiously, the Japanese age of consent is 13)." GameDaily listed her under "hot, but annoying", questioning her about always following Ryu and wanting him to fight her as she is "either an innocent fan or a psycho." In 2010, Play included Sakura's schoolgirl costume among the top inappropriate outfits due to her exposure in fights. That same year, Dave Cook from Now Gamer listed a fight between Sakura and Ling Xiaoyu as one of the fights he wished to see in Street Fighter X Tekken, opining that as while the two shared unsuitable outfits, the two are entertaining in terms of gameplay.

See also
List of Street Fighter characters

References

External links

 (Street Fighter V)
Sakura's profile at Street Fighter IV official website 

Ansatsuken
Characters designed by Akira Yasuda
Female characters in anime and manga
Female characters in video games
Fictional Japanese people in video games
Fictional martial artists in video games
Fictional judoka
Fictional karateka
Fictional sports coaches
Street Fighter characters
Teenage characters in video games
Video game characters introduced in 1996
Woman soldier and warrior characters in video games
Capcom protagonists